γ-Hydroxybutyraldehyde is the organic compound with the formula HOCH2CH2CH2CHO.  It is a colorless liquid.  The compound occurs in nature and is produced commercially.

Occurrence
It is a chemical intermediate in the biosynthesis of the neurotransmitter γ-hydroxybutyric acid (GHB) from 1,4-butanediol (1,4-BD). Like 1,4-BD, it also behaves as a prodrug to GHB when taken exogenously. However, as with all aliphatic aldehydes, γ-hydroxybutaldehyde is caustic and is strong-smelling and foul-tasting; thus, actual ingestion of this compound is likely to be unpleasant and result in severe nausea and vomiting.

See also

 1,6-Dioxecane-2,7-dione
 3-Hydroxybutanal
 Aceburic acid
 Ethyl acetoxy butanoate

References

Hydroxy aldehydes
GHB receptor agonists
GABAB receptor agonists
Prodrugs
Sedatives
Foul-smelling chemicals